Steve Maxwell is an Australian retired association football (soccer) player who played as a striker. Maxwell's club career was predominantly with South Australian club Adelaide City during their time in the former National Soccer League where he would see multiple titles. Maxwell played the 1987 National Soccer League season with Sydney club Marconi Stallions before returning to Adelaide. Internationally, Maxwell was called upon for the Australia U20's squad in 1983, but didn't make an appearance. He would have to wait until 1986 at the age of twenty-three, making his debut against Czechoslovakia on 6 August 1986 for the senior national team. Maxwell would make a total of four senior international appearances over a six-year span.

Honours

Club
Adelaide City
 National Soccer League Finals: 1986, 1991–92, 1993–94
 National Soccer League Cup: 1989, 1991–92

References

1965 births
Living people
Soccer players from Adelaide
Australian soccer players
Association football forwards
Australia international soccer players
National Soccer League (Australia) players
Adelaide City FC players
Marconi Stallions FC players